The Zeppelin-Staaken R.VI was a four-engined German biplane strategic bomber of World War I, and the only Riesenflugzeug ("giant aircraft") design built in any quantity.

The R.VI was the most numerous of the R-bombers built by Germany, and also among the earliest closed-cockpit military aircraft (the first being the Russian Sikorsky Ilya Muromets). The bomber was reputedly the largest wooden aircraft to be produced in any quantity during World War I, with only the Siemens-Schuckert R.VIII prototype bomber of 1916–1919 being larger, with the Staaken R.VI's wingspan of  nearly equaling that of the World War II Boeing B-29 Superfortress, although significantly less than the  span of the Siemens-Schuckert R.VIII.

Design and development

In September 1914, at the start of World War I, Ferdinand von Zeppelin visualised the concept of a Riesenflugzeug (R) bomber, to be larger than the then-nascent Friedel-Ursinus twin-engined military aircraft. Using engineers from the Robert Bosch GmbH, he created the Versuchsbau Gotha-Ost (VGO) consortium in a rented hangar at the Gotha factory. Alexander Baumann became his chief engineer, although later the team included other noted engineers including Zeppelin's associate Claudius Dornier, the 1915 pioneer of all-metal aircraft construction in Hugo Junkers and Baumann's protogé Adolph Rohrbach. Almost all of these Zeppelin-Staaken Riesenflugzeug designs used some variation of either pusher configuration and/or push-pull configuration in their engine layout, orientation and placement of their powerplants.

The first Riesenflugzeug built was the VGO.I flying in April 1915, using three engines; two pusher and one tractor, with a  span, four-bay interplane strut layout for its slightly swept-back leading edge biplane configuration, maintained throughout the entire Zeppelin-Staaken R-series of aircraft during World War I. The VGO.I was built for the Marine-Fliegerabteilung (Imperial German naval Air service) and served on the Eastern Front Later modified with two extra engines, it crashed during tests at Staaken. A similar machine, the VGO.II was also used on the Eastern Front.

Baumann was an early expert in light-weight construction techniques and placed the four engines in nacelles mounted between the upper and lower wing decks to distribute the loads to save weight in the wing spars.

The next aircraft, the VGO.III was a six-engined design  The 160 hp Maybach engines were paired to drive the three propellers. It served with Riesenflugzeug Abteilung (Rfa) 500.

In 1916 VGO moved to the Berlin suburb of Staaken, to take advantage of the vast Zeppelin sheds there. The successor to the VGO III became the Staaken R.IV (IdFlieg number R.12/15), the only "one-off" Zeppelin-Staaken R-type to survive World War I, powered by a total of six engines, driving three propellers: a tractor configuration system in the nose and two pusher-mount nacelle mounts between the wings. By the autumn of 1916, Staaken was completing its R.V, the R.VI prototype, and R.VII versions of the same design, and Idflieg selected the R.VI for series production over the 6-engined R.IV and other Riesenflugzeug designs, primarily those of Siemens-Schuckertwerke AG.

With four direct-drive engines in a tandem push-pull arrangement, and a fully enclosed cockpit, the R.VI design required none of the complex gearboxes of other R-types. Each R.VI bomber cost 557,000 marks and required the support of a 50-man ground crew. The R.VI required a complex 18-wheel undercarriage consisting of twin nosewheels and a quartet of four-wheeled groupings for its main gear to support its weight, and carried two mechanics in flight, seated between the engines in open niches cut in the center of each nacelle. The bombs were carried in an internal bomb bay located under the central fuel tanks, with three racks each capable of holding seven bombs. The R.VI was capable of carrying the 1000 kg PuW bomb.

Although designed by Versuchsbau, because of the scope of the project, the production R.VI's were manufactured by other firms: seven by Schütte-Lanz using sheds at Flugzeugwerft GmbH Staaken, Berlin; six by Automobil und Aviatik A.G. (Aviatik) (the original order was for three); and three by Albatros Flugzeugwerke. 13 of the production models were commissioned into service before the armistice and saw action.

One R.VI was as a float-equipped seaplane for the Marine-Fliegerabteilung (Imperial German Naval Air Service), with the designation Type L and s/n 1432, using Maybach engines. After the first flight on 5 September 1917 the Type "L" crashed during testing on June 3, 1918. The Type 8301, of which four were ordered and three delivered, was developed from the R.VI by elevating the fuselage above the lower wing for greater water clearance, eliminating the bomb bays, and enclosing the open gun position on the nose.

The special "R.30/16" test aircraft
R.VI serial number R.30/16 was the earliest known supercharged aircraft to fly, with a fifth engine - a Mercedes D.II - installed in the central fuselage, driving a Brown-Boveri four-stage supercharger at some 6,000 rpm. The idea of supercharging an aircraft's propeller-driving piston engines with an extra powerplant used solely to power a supercharger was not attempted again by Germany until later in World War II, when both the Dornier Do 217P and Henschel Hs 130E experimental bomber designs each revived the idea as the Höhen-Zentrale-Anlage system. The R.30/16 aircraft was later fitted with four examples of one of the first forms of variable-pitch propellers, believed to have been ground-adjustable only.

Operational service

The R.VI equipped two Luftstreitkräfte (Imperial German Army Air Service) units, Riesenflugzeug-Abteilung (Rfa) 500 and Rfa 501, with the first delivered June 28, 1917.

The units first served on the Eastern Front, based at Alt-Auz and Vilua in Kurland until August 1917. Almost all missions were flown at night with  bomb loads, operating between  altitude. Missions were of three to five hours' duration.

Rfa 501 transferred to Ghent, Belgium, to attack France and Great Britain, arriving September 22, 1917, at Sint-Denijs-Westrem airdrome. Rfa 501 later moved its base to Scheldewindeke airdrome south of group headquarters at Gontrode, while Rfa 500 was based at Castinne, France, with its primary targets French airfields and ports.

Rfa 501, with an average of five R.VI's available for missions, conducted 11 raids on Great Britain between September 28, 1917, and May 20, 1918, dropping  of bombs in 30 sorties. Aircraft flew individually to their targets on moonlit nights, requesting directional bearings by radio after takeoff, then using the River Thames as a navigational landmark. Missions on the  round trip lasted seven hours. None were lost in combat over Great Britain (compared to 28 Gotha G bombers shot down over England), but two crashed returning to base in the dark.

Four R.VI's were shot down in combat (one-third of the operational inventory), with six others destroyed in crashes, of the 13 commissioned during the war. Six of the 18 eventually built survived the war or were completed after the armistice.

Discovered crash site
Very little remains of these giant bombers, although nearly a century after the end of World War I amateur historians of the "Poelcapelle 1917 Association vzw" working in Poelkapelle, northeast of Ypres, identified a wreck that was found in 1981 by Daniel Parrein, a local farmer who was plowing his land. For a while it was thought that the wreck was that of French ace Georges Guynemer's SPAD S.XIII; however that was discounted when repair tools were found at the site, and further research pointed that the engine was a Mercedes D.IVa, possibly of a Gotha G bomber. A comparison of recovered parts was inconclusive, since the parts were common to a number of aircraft other than the Gotha G.

In 2007 the researchers, Piet Steen with some help of Johan Vanbeselaere, finally made a conclusive identification after visiting one of the few partial specimens (the distinctive engine nacelles) in a Kraków air museum. With the help of the Polish aviation historians, parts were identified as those of Zeppelin-Staaken R.VI R.34/16, which crashed on 21 April 1918 after a mission against the Royal Air Force airfield at Saint-Omer, France. The R.VI was shot down, apparently by anti-aircraft fire of the British 2nd Army, while trying to cross the front line, killing all seven crew members.

Variants

Zeppelin-Staaken R.VI
The first true production Zeppelin-Staaken Riesenflugzeug was the R.VI. This giant aircraft was powered either by four 245 hp (183KW) Maybach MbIV engines or four 260 hp(194KW) Mercedes D.IVa engines. The fuselage was similar to the previous aircraft but the cockpit was extended forwards, enclosed and glazed with a gunners cockpit in the extreme nose. Other improvements included aluminium alloy structure in the triple finned biplane tail unit, which was built with inverse camber to improve the stabilising downforce. Eighteen R.VIs were built serialled 'R25' to 'R39' and 'R52' to 'R54' all except 'R30', which was used exclusively as a supercharged engine test-bed, saw service in the Luftstreitkräfte with Rfa500 and Rfa 501 on the western front stationed in the Ghent area. Air raids on England by R.VIs began on 17 September 1917. Many air raids attributed to Gotha bombers were, in fact, carried out by Zeppelin-Staaken R.VI or R.XIV bombers, with direct hits on the Royal Hospital Chelsea with the first 1,000 kg bomb dropped on England, on 16/17 February 1918. St Pancras Station was attacked the next night. During the campaign from 18 December 1917 to 20 May 1918 the R.VIs of Rfa501 made eleven raids dropping 27,190 kg (28tons) of bombs. Eighteen built.

Zeppelin-Staaken R.VII
Differing little from the R.IV, the R.VII had a revised arrangement of struts in the tail unit. The sole R.VII, serialled R 14/15, crashed during its delivery flight to the front line. One built.
Zeppelin-Staaken R.XIV
The R.XIV closely resembled previous Zeppelin-Staaken Riesenflugzeug differing only in engine installation and details. The five Maybach MbIV engines were arranged as push-pull pairs in the nacelles, with the engineer accommodated between the engines, and a single tractor engine in the nose.
Three R.XIVs were built, serialled R 43/16 to R 45/16, of which R 43/16 was shot down by Capt. Archibald Buchanan Yuille of No. 151 Squadron RAF.

Zeppelin-Staaken R.XV
The R.XV also carried on the five engine layout of the R.XIV but introduced a large central fin in the tail unit. Three R.XVs were built, serialled R 46/16 to R 48/16 but there is no evidence that they carried out operational flights.

Zeppelin-Staaken Type "L" Seaplane
Allocated the serial no. 1432 by the Kaiserliche Marine the aircraft was wrecked during trials. One built.

Zeppelin-Staaken Type 8301 Seaplane
In a further attempt to develop a useful large seaplane for the Kaiserliche Marine, Zeppelin-Staaken used R.VI wings mated to an all new fuselage, which incorporated the large central fin of the R.XV, suspended midway between the mainplanes, all supported by floats similar to the 'Type "L"'. Three were built, serialled 8301, 8303 and 8304, of which 8301 was also tested with a land undercarriage, the existence of 8302 has not been confirmed.

Operators
 
 Luftstreitkräfte – Imperial German Air Service
 Riesenflugzeugabteilung 500 (Rfa500)
 Riesenflugzeugabteilung 501 (Rfa501)
 Marine-Fliegerabteilung – Imperial German Naval Air Service
 
 One (R-39/16) - Ukrainian Air force. Crashed on August 4, 1919.

Specifications (Zeppelin-Staaken R.VI)

Notes

Notable appearances in media

See also

Notes

References
Gray, P., and Thetford, O. German Aircraft of the First World War  1970 Putnam London 0 85177 809 7
Haddow, George W., and Grosz, Peter M., The German Giants: The Story of the R-Planes 1914-1919, (1962, 3rd ed. 1988), 
Wagner, Ray, and Nowarra, Heinz, German Combat Planes, Doubleday, 1971.
A. K. Rohrbach, "Das 1000-PS Verkehrsflugzeug der Zeppelin-Werke, Staaken", Zeitschrift für Flugtechnik und Motorluftschiffahrt, vol. 12, no. 1 (15 January 1921);
E. Offermann, W. G. Noack, and A. R. Weyl, Riesenflugzeuge, in: Handbuch der Flugzeugkunde (Richard Carl Schmidt & Co., 1927).

External links 

 Perspective line drawing of R.VI design
 Three-view drawing of Zeppelin-Staaken R.VI
 Photos of engine nacelle of an R.VI. in Kraków Aviation museum
 R.VI article  at westernfrontassociation.com

Zeppelin-Staaken
1910s German bomber aircraft
Military aircraft of World War I
Pusher aircraft
Aircraft first flown in 1916